Walter Russell Mead (born June 12, 1952) is an American academic. He is the James Clarke Chace Professor of Foreign Affairs and Humanities at Bard College and taught American foreign policy at Yale University. He was also the editor-at-large of The American Interest magazine. Mead is a columnist for The Wall Street Journal, a scholar at the Hudson Institute, and a book reviewer for Foreign Affairs, the quarterly foreign policy journal published by the Council on Foreign Relations.

Early life and education
Mead was born on June 12, 1952 in Columbia, South Carolina. His father, Loren Mead, was an Episcopal priest and scholar who grew up in South Carolina. His mother is the former Polly Ayres Mellette. Mead is one of four children with two brothers and one sister. Mead was educated at the Groton School, a private boarding school in Groton, Massachusetts. He then graduated from Yale University, where he earned a Bachelor of Arts degree in English literature.

Career
Mead is the James Clarke Chace Professor of Foreign Affairs and Humanities at Bard College and previously taught American foreign policy at Yale University. He was also the editor-at-large of The American Interest. In 2014, he joined the Hudson Institute as a Distinguished Scholar in American Strategy and Statesmanship. He served as the Henry A. Kissinger Senior Fellow for U.S. Foreign Policy at the Council on Foreign Relations until 2010, and is a Global View Columnist for The Wall Street Journal. He is a cofounder of the New America Foundation, a thinktank that has been described as "radical centrist" in orientation.

An active faculty member at Bard's campus in Annandale and its New York-based Globalization and International Affairs Program, he teaches on American foreign policy and Anglo-American grand strategy, including curriculum addressing Sun Tzu and Clausewitz. He has conducted coursework on the role of public intellectuals in the internet age, as well as the role of religion in diplomacy. Mead is also a regular instructor for the U.S. State Department's Study of the U.S. Institutes (SUSIs) for Scholars and Secondary Educators. His past teaching positions have included Brady-Johnson Distinguished Fellow in Grand Strategy, at Yale University, from 2008 to 2011, as well as Presidents Fellow at the World Policy Institute at The New School, from 1987 to 1997.

Books

The Arc of a Covenant

His most recent book, The Arc of a Covenant: The United States, Israel, and the Fate of the Jewish People was published by Knopf in 2022. Mead argues that Gentile support for a Jewish state and geopolitical realities have influenced US policy towards Israel as much as anything else.

God and Gold
In October 2007, he published God and Gold: Britain, America, and the Making of the Modern World about the Anglo-American tradition of world power since the 17th century. It argues that the individualism inherent in British and American religion was instrumental for their rise to global power and integrates Francis Fukuyama's "end of history" with Samuel Huntington's "clash of civilizations" in its predictions for the future. The Economist, The Financial Times and The Washington Post all listed God and Gold as one of the best non-fiction books of the year.

Power, Terror, Peace and War
In June 2005, Mead published Power, Terror, Peace and War: America's Grand Strategy in a World at Risk. The book outlines American foreign policy under the Bush administration after September 11, 2001 and contextualizes it in the history of U.S. foreign policy. In it, Mead recommends changes in the American approach to terrorism, the Israel-Palestine conflict, and international institutions.

Special Providence

In 2001, Mead published Special Providence: American Foreign Policy and How it Changed the World. It won the Lionel Gelber Award for the best book in English on International Relations in 2002. The Italian translation won the Premio Acqui Storia, an annual award for the most important historical book published. Special Providence, which stemmed from an article originally published in the Winter 1999/2000 issue of The National Interest, "The Jacksonian Tradition,"  describes the four main guiding philosophies that have influenced the formation of American foreign policy in history: the Hamiltonians, the Wilsonians, the Jeffersonians, and the Jacksonians.

The New Left Review described the book as a "robust celebration of Jacksonianism as it historically was... an admiring portrait of a tough, xenophobic folk community, ruthless to outsiders or deserters, rigid in its codes of honour and violence." Not all critics praised the book, however. "Despite the hype surrounding the book, it ultimately challenges little," the geographer Joseph Nevins wrote. "To the contrary, it reinforces the tired notion of U.S. exceptionalism. Thus, he [Mead] paints U.S. deployment of violence as inherently less brutal than that of Washington's enemies. In doing so, he sometimes grossly understates the human devastation wrought by the United States."

Jacksonianism and Trump administration
Of the four traditions of American politics described in Special Providence, Jacksonianism has received the most attention. Mead has expanded and applied his description of Jacksonianism in his other writings.

The idea of a Jacksonian tradition in American politics has received greater interest and attention since the candidacy and election of Donald Trump, particularly because of both former White House Chief Strategist Steve Bannon's references to Jackson and comparisons of Jackson to Trump. The New York Times has speculated that Bannon drew inspiration from Mead's description of Jacksonianism in Special Providence.

In an interview with Politico, Mead was dubbed the "Trump Whisperer" by the author Susan Glasser.

Mortal Splendor
Mead's first book, Mortal Splendor: The American Empire in Transition, was published in 1987. He argues that American policy under Presidents Richard Nixon and Jimmy Carter stifled sustainable development in the Third World. Reviewing the book in Foreign Affairs, John C. Campbell called Mortal Splendor "a brilliantly written demolition of both liberal and especially conservative shibboleths concerning the political economy of the United States, both in its domestic and international arrangements."

Political positions

Mead is a Global View Columnist for Wall Street Journal, and a regular contributor to Foreign Affairs.

From 2009 until August 2017, Mead oversaw a daily blog, "Via Meadia", on the website of the journal The American Interest. Mead published a piece in the 2014 May/June issue of Foreign Affairs titled "The Return of Geopolitics".

Positions on interventions in recent conflicts
In 2003, he argued that an Iraq War was preferable to continuing UN sanctions against Iraq, because "Each year of containment is a new Gulf War", and that "The existence of al Qaeda, and the attacks of Sept. 11, 2001, are part of the price the United States has paid to contain Saddam Hussein." He has since become more critical of the war, and advocated for the Republican Party to change its official policy on it.

Mead was critical of the 2011 NATO intervention in Libya, calling it "reckless and thoughtless".

Mead was also critical of President Barack Obama's decision not to launch a military strike against Syria in retaliation for Syrian President Bashar al-Assad's use of chemical weapons against civilians. He argued that Obama made an "empty statement" by condemning the attacks without accompanying military force, had damaged American credibility, and encouraged Russia and Iran to ramp up their direct support for al-Assad's regime. Mead supported arming Syrian rebels.

Decline of the "Blue Social Model"

Mead has written extensively about the decline of the "Blue Social Model," which refers to the political and economic status quo of the United States following the New Deal and World War II.

Dispute with Walt and Mearsheimer
Mead has been a strong critic of the "Israel Lobby" hypothesis advanced by political scientists Stephen Walt and John Mearsheimer. In a review of their book The Israel Lobby and U.S. Foreign Policy in Foreign Affairs, he insists that domestic factors are generally irrelevant to foreign policy, and the "Israel Lobby" hypothesis strongly insists on the opposite. Mead also notes that contrary to Walt and Mearsheimer's claim that pro-Israel groups exert influence through campaign finance, pro-Israel groups contributed less than one percent of PAC contributions in the 2006 election cycle. Mead agreed that pro-Israel political advocacy is a topic worthy of study but argued that the US policy on Israel grows out of more diverse and complicated historical reasons than described in The Israel Lobby.

Transatlantic relations

Mead has been a strong supporter of transatlantic relations. He is currently a Richard von Weizsäcker Fellow at the Bosch Stiftung.

"China Is the Real Sick Man of Asia" controversy
In February 2020, Mead published an opinion piece in The Wall Street Journal titled "China Is the Real Sick Man of Asia". The title, chosen by the Journals editors, was criticized by a Chinese foreign spokesperson and some professors in the United States as racist; the article was defended by the CEO of the company that published the journal 53 reporters and editors of the Wall Street Journal signed an open letter criticizing the headline and urging the newspaper's leaders "to consider correcting the headline and apologizing to our readers, sources, colleagues and anyone else who was offended" by it. The demand for apology was rejected by academic Susan L. Shirk who, according to an article in The New York Times, said that there was reason for the newspaper to refrain from making an apology as the Chinese government had also demanded one. In March the Chinese government expelled three Wall Street Journal reporters from China over the article, the first such expulsion since 1998. This decision drew criticism from the State Department, the Foreign Correspondents' Club of China and an article in USA Today.

Personal life
Mead lives in Washington, D.C. He is a member of the Church of the Advent, an Anglican church in Washington.

References

External links

 Via Meadia, Walter Russell Mead's blog at The American Interest
 Profile at Council on Foreign Relations
 Column archive at Foreign Relations (CFR)
 Column archive at Business Insider
 
 
 
 
 
Articles
 Walter Russell Mead at Politico's The Arena''
 
 The Tea Party and American Foreign Policy: What Populism Means for Globalism March/April 2011 Foreign Affairs
 The Myth of America's Decline April 9, 2012
 China Is the Real Sick Man of Asia Feb. 2020

1952 births
Living people
Writers from Columbia, South Carolina
Groton School alumni
Yale University alumni
Bard College faculty
Journalists from South Carolina
Radical centrist writers
Hudson Institute
New America (organization)
Carnegie Council for Ethics in International Affairs
The Wall Street Journal people
American Anglican Church in North America members